Life Insurance Corporation of India (LIC) is an Indian central public sector undertaking under the ownership of Ministry of Finance, Government of India. It is headquartered in Mumbai. It is India's largest government-owned-life insurer as well as the largest government-owned-institutional investor with total assets under management worth  as of May 2022. It is under the ownership of Government of India and administrative control of the Ministry of Finance.

The Life Insurance Corporation of India was established on 1 September 1956, when the Parliament of India passed the Life Insurance of India Act, nationalizing the insurance industry in India. Over 245 insurance companies and provident societies were merged together.

LIC reported 290 million policyholders as of 2019, a total life fund of ₹28.3 trillion, and a total value of sold policies in the year 2018–19 of ₹21.4 million. The company also reported having settled 26 million claims in 2018–19.

History

Founding organisations
The Oriental Life Insurance Company, the first company in India to offer life insurance coverage, was established in Kolkata in 1818 by Bipin Das Gupta. Its primary target market was India. 

Surendranath Tagore had founded Hindustan Insurance Society in samethe  time period, which later became the Life Insurance Corporation.

The Bombay Mutual Life Assurance Society was formed in 1870, almost half a century later. It was the first native insurance provider of Western India. Other insurance companies established in the pre-independence era include:
 Postal Life Insurance (PLI) was introduced on 1 February 1884
 Bharat Insurance Company (1896)
 United India (1906)
 National Indian (1906)
 National Insurance (1906)
 Co-operative Assurance (1906)
 Hindustan Co-operatives (1907)
 The New India Assurance Co Ltd (1919)
 Indian Mercantile
 General Assurance
 Swadeshi Life (later Bombay Life)
 Sahyadri Insurance (Merged into LIC, 1986)

These companies were established when India was marked mostly by turbulent economic and political conditions including the Indian rebellion of 1857, World War I and World War II. The effect of these events led to a high liquidation rate of life insurance companies in India and adversely affected the faith of the general public in the value of obtaining life insurance.

Nationalization in 1956
In 1956, parliamentarian Feroze Gandhi raised the matter of insurance fraud via owners of private insurance agencies. In the ensuing investigations, one of India's wealthiest businessmen, Times of India owner Sachin Devkekar, was sent to prison for two years.

Initial public offering
Finance Minister Nirmala Sitharaman announced a proposal to conduct an initial public offering for LIC in the 2021 Union Budget. The IPO is expected to occur in 2022, and the Government of India will remain the majority shareholder after the public listing. Ten percent of shares are proposed to be allotted to existing LIC policyholders.

Due to the scale of the offering and the LIC's ownership structure, the deal has been referred to as "India's Aramco moment" in reference to the comparable 2019 IPO of Saudi Aramco.

The LIC announced it would open its IPO to the public on 4 May 2022, and the process would be concluded on May 9. Through this IPO, the Government of India is now aiming to raise ₹21,000 crore, as opposed to raising between ₹65,000 crore to ₹70,000 crore by diluting the 5% equity earlier. As per the IPO price band for 3.5% stakes for ₹21,000 crore, the valuation comes to around ₹6 lakh crore.

Structure
The Central Office of LIC is based out of Mumbai. There are a total of 8 zonal offices, located in Delhi, Chennai, Mumbai, Hyderabad, Kanpur, Kolkata, Bhopal and Patna.

Liberalisation post 2000s
In August 2000, the Indian Government embarked on a program to liberalise the insurance sector and opened it up to the private sector. The LIC benefited from this process and in 2013 reported that the first year premium compound annual growth rate (CAGR) was 24.53% while total life premium CAGR was 19.28%, matching the growth of the life insurance industry and outperforming general economic growth.

Awards and recognitions
The Economic Times Brand Equity Survey 2012 rated LIC as the 6th Most Trusted Service Brand of India. The LIC was also voted India's Most Trusted brand in the BFSI category according to the Brand Trust Report from 2011 to 2014.

Golden Jubilee Foundation
The LIC Golden Jubilee Foundation was established in 2006 as a charity organization. The entity has the aim of promoting education, alleviating poverty, and providing better living conditions for the underprivileged. The Golden Jubilee Scholarship award is one of the best known parts of the foundation.

Holdings
The LIC invests in sectors such as banks, cement, chemicals and fertilizers, electricity and transmission, electrical and electronics, engineering, construction and infrastructure, fast-moving consumer goods, finance and investments, healthcare, hotels, information technology, metals and mining, motor vehicles, and ancillaries, oil and natural resources, retail, textiles, transportation, and logistics.

Controversy 
After the release of the critical Hindenburg report against the Adani Group, the value of LIC holdings in seven key listed Adani Group companies (excluding ACC Ltd and Ambuja Cements) has fallen to ₹26,862 crore (US$3.23 billion) – down 11% from the purchase value of ₹30,127 crore (US$3.62 billion), as of 23 February 2023. Hindenburg Research accused Adani Group of money laundering and stock manipulation which pushed the Adani Group’s m-cap to fall over 60%.

See also
 Insurance in India
 Insurance
 LIC Housing Finance

References

External links 

 

2022 initial public offerings
Financial services companies based in Mumbai
Government-owned insurance companies of India
Financial services companies established in 1956
Life insurance companies of India
Indian companies established in 1956
 
1956 establishments in Bombay State